Khanamrud Rural District is in the Central District of Heris County, East Azerbaijan province, Iran. At the National Census of 2006, its population was 3,488 in 796 households. There were 3,498 inhabitants in 835 households at the following census of 2011. At the most recent census of 2016, the population of the rural district was 3,321 in 1,017 households. The largest of its 19 villages was Gowaravan, with 796 people.

References 

Heris County

Rural Districts of East Azerbaijan Province

Populated places in East Azerbaijan Province

Populated places in Heris County